Ruggles is a surname. Notable people with the surname include:

Alice Ruggles Sohier (1880–1969), American painter
Carl Ruggles (1876–1971), American composer
 Charles H. Ruggles (1789–1865), New York chief judge 
 Charles Ruggles (1886-1970), character actor, older brother of Wesley
 Clive Ruggles (born 1952) British Astronomer
 Daniel Ruggles (1810–1897) Confederate general
 David Ruggles (1810–1849), abolitionist
 Eleanor Ruggles (1916-2008), American biographer
 Nathaniel Ruggles (1761–1819), US Representative from Massachusetts
 Samuel B. Ruggles (1800–1881), American lawyer and founder of Gramercy Park, New York City
 Steven Ruggles (born 1955), American historical demographer
 Timothy Ruggles (1711–1795), American military leader, jurist and politician
 Timothy Ruggles (Nova Scotia politician) (1776–1831), grandson of the above
 Tom Ruggles (born 1992), Australian footballer
 Wesley Ruggles (1889-1972), film director/producer, younger brother of Charles
 William Ruggles (1797–1877), professor at George Washington University